Part Two (Part II) of the Constitution of Albania is the second of eighteen parts. Titled The Fundamental Human Rights and Freedoms, it is divided into 6 chapters that consist of 49 articles.

The Fundamental Human Rights and Principles 

Chapter I: General Principles

Chapter II: Personal Rights and Freedoms

Chapter III: Political Rights and Freedoms

Chapter IV: Economic, Social and Cultural Rights and Freedoms

Chapter V: Social Objectives

Chapter VI: People's Advocate

References

2